KOGA is a Dutch bicycle manufacturer based in Heerenveen, Friesland. The company is known for its long time partnership with Japanese frame manufacturer Miyata, producing bicycles and sponsoring racing teams under the brand name Koga Miyata. As of May 2010 the partnership ended and the company began manufacturing bicycles under the KOGA brand.

History 
The company was founded by Andries Gaastra in 1974, who had left his function at his father's company Batavus. The name Koga is a combination of his surname and that of his wife Marion Kowallik. The addition of Miyata came from the cooperation with Japanese manufacturer Miyata. Koga Miyata relied on Japanese components from manufacturers such as Shimano.

From 1980 Koga Miyata sponsored the IJsboerke cycle team whose member, the Dutch Peter Winnen, won a stage in the Tour de France at the Alpe d'Huez soon after, leading to wider recognition.

In 1992, Gaastra sold his company to the Atag Cycle Group, which had acquired Batavus six years earlier.

KOGA is now owned by the Accell Group.

Products 
Koga Miyata started with the use of Japanese components. The design and assemblage of the bicycles was done by hand in the Netherlands.

At first Koga Miyata only produced racing bicycles. In 1976 they added a range of randonneurs or touring bicycles, and in 1986 mountain bikes. In 1993, after it was acquired by the Atag Cycle Group, Koga Miyata also produced hybrid bicycles. 

Koga now produce a range of e-bikes (bicycles with an electrical assist system), city-bikes and racing road-bikes. They have also recently started producing a line of gravel-bikes.
Additionally, Koga track-bikes have seen some success in the past decade, with the 'Koga Kinsei' frame claiming a gold medal at the UEC European Track Championships.

Koga bikes are especially known for assembling their bikes by hand, and for "smooth welded" aluminium frames; nearly all Koga bikes have their welds smoothed out before painting.

Early models 
Some of the early company brochures are publicly available for download.
 Pro-Racer
 Pro-Luxe
 FullPro-L
 Gents-Racer
 Gents-Touring
 Gents-Luxe
 Road Racer
 Road Winner
 Road Speed 
 Road-Mixed
 Silver-Ace

Current models 
A summary of the Koga 2023 bicycle-lineup:

E-bikes 
 Pace
 E-Nova
 Vectro
 E-Inspire
 E-Worldtraveller

City-/touring-/trekking-bikes 
 F3
 Supermetro
 Worldtraveller

Road-/Gravel-bikes 
 Kimera
 Colmaro
 Senko
 Kinsei

References

External links

Bicycle framebuilders
Cycle manufacturers of the Netherlands
Vehicle manufacturing companies established in 1974
1974 establishments in the Netherlands
Companies based in Friesland
Heerenveen